HMS Coromandel was a 56-gun fourth rate of the Royal Navy, previously the East Indiaman Winterton. She was purchased on the stocks in 1795, used as a troopship from 1796, was converted to a convalescent ship in 1807 for Jamaica, and was sold there in 1813.

Military career
The Royal Navy purchased Winterton on the stocks, and commissioned her as HMS Coromandel in June 1795 under Captain John Inglis. The Admiralty must have been dissatisfied with her as they transferred her to the Transport Board in May 1796 and paid her off in July. Coromandel was recommissioned later that month as a troopship under the command of Lieutenant Richard Harrison. He received a letter of marque dated 15 July 1796. The Navy then struck Coromandel off the Navy List on 9 August.

Richard (or Robert) Simmonds replaced Harrison in 1797. Richard Simmonds received a letter of marque dated 17 November 1797. A year later, on 7 November 1798, Coromandel was at the capture of Minorca. Her officers and crew therefore participated in their share of a partial payment of £20,000 for goods and stores captured at that time. Another payment followed later. Eight days after the fall of Minorca, on 15 November, Coromandel captured the Spanish ship Misericordia, of Minorca, which was carrying a cargo of paper.

Commander John Mortimer replaced Simmonds in July 1799, in the West Indies. He remained in command until some point in 1801. Between 15 March 1801 and 7 April, Coromandel participated in the capture of the islands of St Bartholomew, Saint Martin, St Thomas, and St. Croix as part of the expedition under Lieutenant General Thomas Trigge and Admiral John Duckworth. On 4 January 1802 she ran ashore in Jamaica, but was got off and on 18 January she sailed for Martinique.

Coromandel was back in Britain by August 1802, being fitted at Chatham for service as a troopship. She then spent the period June through October 1807 being fitted at Chatham as a convalescent ship for service in Jamaica.

Fate
Coromandel was sold at Jamaica on 24 July 1813 to Mr. William Barnes for £700. She was sold on condition that she be broken up.

Citations and references
Citations

References
 
  

Ships of the Royal Navy
Ships of the British East India Company
1795 ships
Ships built by the Blackwall Yard
Maritime incidents in 1802
Shipwrecks in the Caribbean Sea